Duru is the surname of the following people:
Alfred Duru (1829–1889), French playwright and operetta librettist 
Djustice Sears-Duru (born 1994), Canadian rugby union player
İsmail Hakkı Duru (born 1946), Turkish theoretical physicist 
Duru–Kleinert transformation
Nükhet Duru (born 1954), Turkish singer
Sandra Duru-Eluobi (born 1982), Nigerian businesswoman 
Welcome Duru (1933–2009), South African actor, boxing promoter, composer, musician and politician